James Claiborne Lincoln, Jr. (August 17, 1889 – February 22, 1952) was an American track and field athlete who competed in the 1920 Summer Olympics.

He was born in Saint Joseph, Missouri as the son of James Claiborne Lincoln Sr. (1862–1923) and Annie Shannon Lard (1863–1899). In 1913, he married Margaret Frazer, with whom he had at least two daughters and one son (also James Claiborne), and later with Winifred Strafford. Lincoln lived most of his live in Missouri and Illinois, but between 1915 and 1921 he lived in New York, working as a manufacturer. He died in Chicago, Illinois.

In 1920 he took part in the javelin throw competition. However, it is for what happened just before the competition that Lincoln is best remembered today. As the world record holder Jonni Myyrä was resting on the grass, his left (non-throwing) arm was struck near the elbow by a Lincoln warm-up throw. Myyrä went on to win the gold medal regardless, while Lincoln finished ninth.

References

External links

1889 births
1952 deaths
American male javelin throwers
Olympic track and field athletes of the United States
Athletes (track and field) at the 1920 Summer Olympics
Sportspeople from St. Joseph, Missouri